Canoe is an unincorporated community in northeastern Winneshiek County, Iowa, United States.

History
A post office was established in August 1857, and remained in operation off and on until being discontinued in December 1905. Canoe's population was 15 in 1925.

References

Unincorporated communities in Winneshiek County, Iowa
Unincorporated communities in Iowa
1857 establishments in Iowa
Populated places established in 1857